Hamad Al-Sagoor (born July 1, 1979) is a retired professional footballer who played as a defender for Al-Akhdoud, Al-Nassr, Al-Raed and Najran.

External links

 

Living people
Saudi Arabian footballers
Al Nassr FC players
1979 births
Al-Raed FC players
Najran SC players
Al-Okhdood Club players
Saudi Fourth Division players
Saudi Professional League players
Saudi Second Division players
Association football defenders
People from Najran